Believe the Children was an advocacy organization formed by the parents involved in the McMartin preschool trial. It was founded in order to raise awareness of allegations of satanic ritual abuse. The organization's name is based on the notion that assertions made by alleged victims of child sexual abuse should be believed. The organization became a clearinghouse for information about ritual abuse from the mid-1980s to the late 1990s.

References

Child abuse-related organizations
Satanic ritual abuse hysteria in the United States